One New Zealand Group Limited, also known as One NZ formally known as Vodafone New Zealand Limited is a New Zealand telecommunications company.
It was a subsidiary of the London-listed company Vodafone Plc until 31 July 2019, when its sale to a consortium comprising Infratil Limited and Brookfield Asset Management Inc. was settled. Vodafone is based in Auckland and was formed in 1998, after Vodafone purchased BellSouth's New Zealand operations. The company employs over 3,000 people and has operations nationwide, with its main offices based in Auckland, Wellington and Christchurch. The company is part of New Zealand Telecommunications Forum. Vodafone is the largest wireless carrier in New Zealand, with 2.5 million subscribers as of July 2019.

The company has invested hundreds of millions of dollars in its mobile network, improving capacity in congested urban areas. It has New Zealand's first 4G LTE network and continues to maintain its 2G network. In February 2013, Vodafone New Zealand launched New Zealand's first LTE mobile network which is currently available to 96% of the population. In June 2014, Vodafone was ranked the fastest mobile network on the planet by speed-testing service Ookla. In December 2019, Vodafone New Zealand launched New Zealand's first 5G mobile network which is currently available in more than 70 towns and cities across New Zealand. Vodafone New Zealand currently operates New Zealand's largest 5G mobile network and New Zealand's only 2G mobile network. In March 2022, Vodafone New Zealand was awarded the best mobile network in New Zealand by umlaut. In August 2022, Vodafone New Zealand announced that from August 31st 2024, Vodafone will start to switch off their 3G mobile network to allow further expansion of Vodafone's 4G/5G mobile network, Vodafone have assured customers that 3G coverage areas will be upgraded to new technologies such as 4G.

In October 2006, Vodafone bought ihug, New Zealand's third largest Internet service provider at the time, to provide Internet service under the Vodafone name. In 2012 Vodafone bought TelstraClear, making it New Zealand's second largest Internet service provider.

In June 2016, Sky TV and Vodafone agreed to merge, with Sky TV purchasing 100% of Vodafone NZ operations for a cash payment of NZ$1.25 billion and issuing new shares to the Vodafone Group. Vodafone UK was to get 51% stake of the company. However, the proposed merger was rejected by the Commerce Commission, resulting in a plunge in Sky TV's shares.

In September 2022, Vodafone announced it will rebrand to One New Zealand in early 2023.

Market share
Vodafone has 2.4 million customers. According to the Commerce Commission's Annual Telecommunications Monitoring Report from March 2022, Vodafone's market share in the mobile market was 38%, Spark 41% and Two Degrees Mobile 19%. The remainder of 2% the market is made up of mobile virtual network operators.

Acquisitions

BellSouth
BellSouth had 138,000 customers when it was purchased by Vodafone in November 1998. BellSouth's main rival was Telecom New Zealand (now Spark), New Zealand's second largest telecommunications company behind Vodafone. Telecom had the advantage that it had a 6-year head-start on BellSouth, however this advantage slipped away in recent years. After Vodafone took over Bellsouth, it expanded network coverage to compete more effectively with Telecom. Vodafone has constantly increased its market share and surpassed Telecom in mobile customers.

ihug
On 11 October 2006, Vodafone acquired ihug from iiNet, and closed the ihug brand in 2008.

TelstraClear
On 31 October 2012, Vodafone acquired 100% of TelstraClear from Australian company Telstra. TelstraClear had its beginnings in New Zealand with Kiwi Cable, Clear Communications in 1990, and Telstra New Zealand in 1996.

Telstra NZ expanded its operations in the business market, bundling Telecom New Zealand services distributed as a reseller with its own network services. It maintained interconnect agreements with Telecom New Zealand, Clear Communications and some smaller service providers. In 1999 Saturn Communications was sold by its parent company, Austar United Communications, to a new joint venture with Telstra that became known as TelstraSaturn. TelstraClear was then created by the merger of Telstra's TelstraSaturn and Clear Communications in December 2001.

In July 2012 Vodafone NZ approached Telstra to purchase TelstraClear for a payment of $840 million, and $450 million that TelstraClear had in its accounts. The Commerce Commission approved the bid on 30 October, and the sale was completed on 31 October. TelstraClear's final trading day was 31 March 2013.

DEFEND Limited
In February 2022 Vodafone NZ signed a conditional agreement to acquire a 60% majority share in cyber security specialist company DEFEND Limited.

Mobile services

Coverage 
Vodafone operates a GSM (2G) mobile phone network at 900 MHz and 1800 MHz, a UMTS (3G) network at 900 MHz and 2100 MHz, and a 4G LTE network at 700 MHz, 1800 MHz, 2100 MHz and 2600 MHz. It states that the network provides service in "Our mobile network covers over 98.5% of the population, with 4G extended coverage to over 93%".

GSM Coverage (2G) 
Vodafone operates a nationwide GSM service in the 900 MHz band. In areas with high demand there are additional GSM services operating in the 1800 MHz band, usually from existing 900 MHz cell sites, to provide more capacity. Areas with both 900 MHz and 1800 MHz service cover most major business districts and large shopping malls. In recent years Vodafone has also established some cell sites that only provide 1800 MHz service where it is difficult to release spectrum for more 900 MHz cell sites. Most phones sold since the mid-1990s support both bands.

In March 2016 Vodafone New Zealand announced plans to shut down its 2G (GSM) network, beginning with voice and messaging services. Vodafone's Spokesperson Elissa Downey commented that they would keep the GSM network running until 2025, although it would only support devices using GSM data such as electricity meters that send readings over the network, and that they would be announcing the end date for its 2G voice service soon. In early August 2016, however, it was reported that Vodafone was reconsidering its choice to shut down the network, with Spokesperson Andrea Brady stating that the 2G network "will not be switched off anytime soon as it continues to serve customers across New Zealand". This announcement came following the company's criticism of rival operator Spark's billboard campaign that claimed "Vodafone's 2G network is shutting down" and invited customers to "switch before [they're] ditched", despite neither Spark, nor its child division Skinny Mobile – whom the campaign was run under – operating a compatible 2G network. The campaign was denounced by Vodafone as "pretty misleading", shortly followed by the announcement that 2G voice services would not be ended any time soon. As of December 2016 Vodafone has not confirmed a date for the termination of its 2G voice network.

UMTS Coverage (3G) 
In the main centres, Vodafone operates UMTS (3G) service using the 2100 MHz band. UMTS service is often provided from the same cell site as 900 MHz and/or 1800 MHz GSM services. Most of the existing 900 MHz sites were built in the 1990s when it was not expected that a 2100 MHz network would be built, hence the existing 900 MHz network was not at all optimised for 2100 MHz service. Due to the fact that 900 MHz and 1800 MHz signals propagate further than 2100 MHz signals, there were many areas beyond 2100 MHz coverage where UMTS phones would have to hand down to 900 MHz or 1800 MHz GSM service. In recent years Vodafone has established many individual 2100 MHz UMTS sites to enhance 3G coverage.

In rural areas, Vodafone has installed 900 MHz UMTS (3G) service alongside their existing 900 MHz GSM (2G) service. The 900 MHz UMTS service has roughly the same coverage area as 900 MHz GSM service, so instances of UMTS service being handed down to GSM should occur far less often in rural areas than in areas covered by the 2100 MHz network. However many older UMTS phones only support 2100 MHz service so these phones will hand down to 900 MHz GSM even though there is UMTS service available at 900 MHz.

Rural Broadband Initiative (RBI) coverage: Vodafone have a contract with the New Zealand government to provide fixed cellular access to the internet with antennas mounted on the outside of buildings, homes and businesses at speeds of at least 5Mbit/s. Much of the coverage as of 2015 is on 900Mhz 3G (hands down to 2G as a backup). By January 2016, Vodafone has actively extended its 4G network throughout key rural areas, and was on track to deliver speeds as high as 100Mbit/s.

RBI is sold by many ISPs and can include voice services and internet services designed to give similar plans and pricing as landline. Vodafone wholesales RBI services over cellular to many ISPs, any ISP may provide RBI services over cellular, ADSL and UFB fibre, what ever is the available at the customers rural property (urban areas are excluded from RBI offerings).

4G LTE Coverage (4G) 
Vodafone offers 4G LTE coverage across New Zealand, claiming coverage to over 96% of the population. Vodafone uses frequencies at 700 MHz (Band 28), 1800 MHz (Band 3), and 2600 MHz (Band 7) for 4G.

4G was originally considered an "add-on" and was included in three higher level plans and the Vodafone Red plans. The 700 MHz 4G LTE frequency used in New Zealand is APT band 28 and was first launched by Vodafone in Papakura on 21 July 2014.

5G NR Coverage (5G) 
Vodafone launched its 5G service in Auckland, Wellington, Christchurch and Queenstown on 10 December 2019, with plans to roll out the service to other cities in 2020.

Mobile virtual network service 
Vodafone NZ also provides services for mobile virtual network operators. This means other companies can resell Vodafone's network services (data, telephone and SMS) under their own brand name. Their customers connect to Vodafone's network as any other Vodafone customer would, but instead of seeing "Vodafone NZ" as the network operator, they will see the name of the company they pay for these services.

MVNO networks do not have their own cellular equipment, so customers connect to Vodafone's network constantly, instead of jumping between networks. Current MVNOs running on Vodafone's network include: Kogan Mobile, MyRepublic and formerly Black + White Mobile.

This is different from 2degrees, who offloads customers onto the Vodafone network when they are not in a 2degrees mobile coverage zone. 2degrees has a roaming agreement with Vodafone NZ, and as such, their customers roam only on the network when they have no coverage, otherwise they connect to 2degrees' own equipment.

Phone numbers 
In New Zealand all mobile phone numbers start with 02. Vodafone is allocated the 021 prefix with other networks being allocated other prefixes – such as 022 to 2degrees, and 027 to Spark. However Number portability was introduced to the New Zealand market on 2 April 2007 which means that customers can bring, for example, their 021 prefixed number to Spark or 2degrees. Within New Zealand, the network is sometimes referred to in speech by its prefix—i.e. 'Are you 021?' instead of 'Are you with Vodafone?'.

029 Prefix 
Vodafone used to operate the 029 prefix on behalf of TelstraClear, in addition to its own 021 prefix. TelstraClear customers, mostly corporates, used to be able to get mobile numbers under this prefix; these customers were billed by TelstraClear instead of being billed directly by Vodafone. In 2007 this agreement lapsed, and in 2008 some of these customers were transitioned to Telecom who serviced them initially with CDMA2000 technology.  Those TelstraClear 029 customers not transitioned to Telecom New Zealand remained with Vodafone. Subsequently, TelstraClear joined Telecom as a MVNO operator, but that relationship soured and TelstraClear re-signed with Vodafone in 2009 and remains on the Vodafone network.

Comparison with 027 Prefix 
Spark NZ (formerly Telecom New Zealand), Vodafone's rival, has fixed 10-digit numbers under its 0272-0279 prefix, which allows approximately 7 million possible numbers. Telecom originally had mixed 9-digits and 10-digits number using the older 025 prefix. The 027 prefix with only 10-digit numbers simplified its numbering system at the time of launching its CDMA network. The older 025 prefix was phased out with its now redundant AMPS and TDMA networks.

3G services 
On Wednesday 10 August 2005 Vodafone introduced a new 3G network employing the UMTS technology widely used in Europe and elsewhere. Using this standard, Vodafone now offers Video Calling, music downloads, SKY mobile TV and other services from its Vodafone live! portal.

Vodafone began rolling out HSPA+ data services on its UMTS network in 2011; at the time of writing (May 2012), Auckland, Wellington and Christchurch have coverage. HSPA+ is capable of a theoretical maximum 168 Mbit/s download speed and 22 Mbit/s upload speed, although higher speeds are only supported in areas with an excellent radio signal.

Vodafone launched HD Voice on 7 November 2013 - a high definition voice call technology. This technology works over 3G with HD Voice compatible phones on Vodafone to Vodafone voice calls.

iPhone 

The first iPhone 3G released on 11 July 2008 was sold by Vodafone in Auckland, New Zealand to 22-year-old student Jonny Gladwell at 12:01 am NZST. The iPhone 3G was only available to customers on the Vodafone network.{ 3G coverage for iPhone 3G was limited to major urban centres, as the phone operated on 850, 1900 and 2100 MHz bands; Vodafone's 3G network uses 900 and 2100 MHz. (The 850 MHz 3G band is used by Spark NZ). 900 MHz capability was added from the iPhone 3GS and subsequent models of iPhone.

Subsequent launches of iPhone models in New Zealand have typically been a few weeks after the worldwide release. The iPhone 5, iPhone 5s and iPhone 5c are CAT3 4G devices and can be used on Vodafone's 4G LTE network on the 1800 MHz frequency. iPhone 6 and iPhone 6 Plus models are CAT4 4G devices and also support the APT 700 MHz frequency (Band 28) in addition to Vodafone's 1800 MHz frequency.

Fixed-line broadband

ADSL and VDSL2 
Vodafone offers copper-based ADSL and VDSL services. (Vodafone had inherited two other ISPs, Paradise.net and Clearnet when it purchased TelstraClear.)

VDSL is a faster xDSL technology available to consumers and businesses based on location. This technology will only function within a certain proximity to the local copper exchange. This technology is used to deliver the BizBroadband and BizNet packages, as well as the IP Voice products (IP FeatureLine, IP Connect, IP Gateway, IP Clarity).

DOCSIS (cable) 
Vodafone also offers DOCSIS cable modem broadband within the former TelstraClear's network.

In June 2016, Vodafone upgraded its cable network to DOCSIS 3.1, in order to support gigabit speeds.

Vodafone currently offers many different speeds on the cable network. The standard plan provides up to 50 Mbit/s download and 2 Mbit/s upload, with a faster plan offering 900 Mbit/s download with 100 Mbit/s upload also available.

Coverage
Vodafone's cable network is available in the following areas:
 most of Wellington City, excluding Tawa, Churton Park, Glenside, Broadmeadows, Ngauranga, Kaiwharawhara, and central Wellington (bound by State Highway 1 and Kent Terrace)
 Lower Hutt, including Wainuiomata and Stokes Valley, but excluding Haywards, Manor Park, the western hill suburbs (west of State Highway 2) and eastern bay suburbs (Point Howard to Muritai, including Eastbourne)
 Upper Hutt, excluding Tōtara Park
 Kapiti urban area (Waikanae to Paekakariki)
 southern and eastern Christchurch, including the suburbs of Mairehau, Shirley, Richmond, Avonside, Dallington, Wainoni, Avondale, Aranui, Bexley, parts of New Brighton and North New Brighton, Bromley, Linwood, Ferrymead, Woolston, Opawa, Waltham, Sydenham, Saint Martins, Beckenham, Somerfield, Addington, Spreydon, Hoon Hay, Hillmorton, Middleton, parts of Riccarton and Upper Riccarton (south of and including Riccarton Road), Sockburn, Broomfield, Hei Hei, and parts of Islington and Hornby.

UFB 
Vodafone offers a range of Ultra-Fast Broadband (fibre) products.

Television 
Vodafone operates an internet television (IPTV) service under the brand "VodafoneTV". It is delivered over a broadband connection. The TV service was previously operated over a cable network formerly owned by TelstraClear in Auckland, Wellington, and Christchurch.

Customers receive Freeview channels via a Vodafone TV box and can subscribe to Sky TV channels. Selected content is available in high-definition.

In September 2010, TelstraClear released their own PVR called the T-Box. The launch followed the release by parent company Telstra (AU) of a similar product. As of June 2011, TelstraClear ceased all analogue transmission on its cable network.

VodafoneTV was relaunched in 2019 as a standalone product. A customer could purchase a VodafoneTV box from a retailer and access the service using any broadband provider. The new box has various OTT media streaming apps pre-installed.

Vodafone announced the closure of the VodafoneTV service on December 9, 2021, to be retired on September 30, 2022. This end date was then extended to February 28, 2023, before being pushed back to March 31, 2023.

Interactive services
 Electronic Programme Guide (EPG) - Television listing information.
 3-day cloud buffer
 Cloud storage
 On-demand

Defunct channels 
 TechTV was available up until May 2004, when current owner Comcast halted international broadcasts. (Source: Vodafone website)
 Chilli (an adult channel) was also available until 2006 when CEO Alan Freeth discontinued the product on moral grounds.
 Wild TV
 Visitor TV (this was closed down after the 22 February earthquake)
 TBN has also ceased due to their financial limitations

Renaming to One New Zealand
On 28 September 2022, it was announced that Vodafone New Zealand will change its name to One New Zealand in early 2023. The announcement came along with the launch of the one.nz website.

Stuff News reported that the naming change could save the company between $20 million and $30 million that it would otherwise be paying in licensing fees. Vodafone NZ claims that customers' ability to roam on networks overseas will be unaffected by the name change.

Stuff News published an article titled "Could Vodafone's rebrand to One New Zealand backfire?", stating that the naming change could be tarnished by the name's association with the defunct NZ political party One NZ. The company's CEO, Jason Paris said on twitter "One NZ stands for the best of NZ (diversity, inclusion, trust, innovation etc),"

Criticism and complaints
Between 2006 and 2009, Vodafone ran a series of advertisements and promotions which were found to be misleading and led to complaints - and eventually a series of large fines in 2011 and 2012 after action was taken by the Commerce Commission under the Fair Trading Act. Vodafone NZ issued an apology for this incident

References

External links

 Vodafone New Zealand's homepage
 Vodafone New Zealand's part owner
 Vodafone Group website

Vodafone
Telecommunications companies established in 1998
Telecommunications companies of New Zealand
Mobile phone companies of New Zealand
Mobile technology
Internet service providers of New Zealand
Companies based in Auckland
New Zealand subsidiaries of foreign companies
New Zealand companies established in 1998